X-linked hypertrichosis is a hereditary disorders characterized by generalized congenital hypertrichosis and thick eyebrows.

X-linked congenital generalized hypertrichosis (CGH), is an extremely rare condition that is primarily characterized  by universal overgrowth of terminal hair. It was first mapped in chromosome Xq24-q27.1 in a Mexican family; however, the underlying genetic facts remain unknown.

See also 
 Generalized hyperhidrosis
 List of cutaneous conditions

References 

Conditions of the skin appendages